Lake Glenada is a natural lake in Highlands County, Florida, south of the city of Avon Park, Florida.

This lake is bounded by the South Florida Community College campus on the north.  Many buildings, including the Joseph E. Johnston Student Center, are on the lake's edge.  On the west and southwest is US 27.  On the south is Lake Glenada RV Resort.

Activities at the lake include fishing and boating.  Lake Glenada RV Resort has their own boat ramp.  A public boat ramp, fishing dock and shelter house is on the west side, just off US 27.

References

Glenada
Glenada